Hans Karl Albert Winkler (23 April 1877 – 22 November 1945) was a German botanist.  He was Professor of Botany at the University of Hamburg, and a director of that university's Institute of Botany. Winkler coined the term 'heteroploidy' in 1916. He is remembered for coining the term 'genome' in 1920, by making a portmanteau of the words gene and chromosome. He wrote: 

This may be translated as: "I propose the expression Genom for the haploid chromosome set, which, together with the pertinent protoplasm, specifies the material foundations of the species ..."
Among his experiments was the discovery of chimeras (also chimaeras) by grafting a Deadly Nightshade and tomato plant and observing a shoot which displayed characteristics of both plants.

Winkler also worked at the University of Naples, in Italy, where he researched the physiology of the alga Bryopsis.

He joined the NSDAP in 1937.

References

20th-century German botanists
1877 births
1945 deaths
Academic staff of the University of Hamburg